Butaw District (Buto) is one of 16 districts of Sinoe County, Liberia. As of 2008, the population was 3,892.

References

 

Districts of Liberia
Sinoe County